This is a list of notable residents of Cincinnati, Ohio.

Politics

Stan Aronoff – member of Ohio Senate 1967–1996, its president from 1989–96
William E. Arthur (1825–1897) – born in Cincinnati, United States Congressman from Kentucky
Walt Bachrach – long-serving Mayor of Cincinnati
Ken Blackwell – former mayor of Cincinnati 1999–2007, Republican, Ohio Secretary of State and unsuccessful 2006 candidate for Governor of Ohio
James G. Birney – abolitionist and Liberty Party presidential candidate
John Boehner – Congressman and former Speaker of the House
William K. Bond – Whig Congressman, 1849–1853
Stanley E. Bowdle – Democratic Congressman, 1913–1915
John Bridgeland – lawyer and activist
Tom Brinkman – Republican Ohio House of Representatives member
Ethan Allen Brown – 7th Governor of Ohio
Henry Francis Bryan – United States Navy Rear Admiral and the 17th governor of American Samoa
Jacob Burnet – U.S. Senator, 1828–1831
Phillip Burton – Democratic Congressman from California
Benjamin Butterworth – Republican Congressman, 1879–1883, 1885–1891
Mary Edith Campbell – Suffragette, Board of Education member
Samuel Fenton Cary – Congressman and temperance movement leader
John Cranley – former mayor of Cincinnati, 2013–2022
Steve Chabot – Republican Congressman, 1995–2009; 2011–2023
Thomas R. Chandler – perennial candidate
Donald D. Clancy – former Republican Congressman
Levi Coffin – Abolitionist, member of the Underground Railroad
Aaron H. Conrow – Confederate congressman and general
Moses Dickson – Abolitionist leader
David T. Disney – Democratic Congressman, 1849–1855
Ozro J. Dodds – Democratic Congressman, 1872–1873
Steve Driehaus – Democratic Congressman, 2009–2011
Alexander Duncan – physician, Democratic Congressman, 1837–1841, 1843–1845
Thomas O. Edwards – Whig Congressman, 1847–1849
Edwin Einstein – Republican Congressman from New York, 1879–1881
Richard Kenneth Fox – United States Ambassador to Trinidad and Tobago, 1977–1979
George Fries – physician, Democratic Congressman, 1845–1849
James W. Gazlay – Republican Congressman, 1823–1825
Thomas Geoghegan – labor lawyer
John J. Gilligan – former Governor of Ohio
Herman P. Goebel – Republican Congressman, 1903–1911
Bill Gradison – Republican Congressman, former mayor of Cincinnati
Buddy Gray – activist and social worker
William S. Groesbeck – lawyer, Democratic Congressman, 1857–1859
John A. Gurley – Republican Congressman, 1859–1863
George W. Hayes – slave, Republican Ohio House of Representatives member
William E. Hess – Republican Congressman, 1929–1937, 1939–1949, 1951–1961
Dave Hobson – former Republican congressman
Cynthia Hogan – counsel to Joe Biden
Henry Thomas Hunt – former mayor of Cincinnati, 1912–1913
Joel Hills Johnson - Utah Territorial legislator, 1849-1850
William J. Keating – former Republican Congressman, brother of Charles Keating
Simon L. Leis, Jr. – Hamilton County, Ohio prosecutor and sheriff
Mark Lippert – former ambassador to South Korea
Nicholas Longworth – former Speaker of the House and Majority Leader
Charlie Luken – former Congressman and Mayor of Cincinnati
Tom Luken – former Congressman
Greg Landsman – Democratic Congressman, 2023–
Robert Todd Lytle – Congressman, 1833–1835
Mark L. Mallory – former mayor of Cincinnati, 2005–2013
William L. Mallory, Sr. – first African-American Ohio House of Representatives majority leader
Sam Malone – former Cincinnati city councilman
Lawrence Maxwell, Jr. – United States Solicitor General, 1893–1895
Neil H. McElroy – Secretary of Defense, 1957–1959
John McLean – Congressman, 1813–16, U.S. Postmaster General, 1823–1829, U.S. Supreme Court justice, 1829–1861
Alexander C. Mitchell – Republican congressman from Kansas, 1911
Tom Mooney – teacher, labor union activist
Harold G. Mosier – Democratic congressman, 1937–1939
Edward Follansbee Noyes – Governor of Ohio, Ambassador to France
Kabaka Oba – civil rights activist
Lucy Evelyn Peabody – conservation activist
Aaron F. Perry – Congressman, 1871–1872
Rob Portman – Congressman, United States Trade Representative; Director of Office of Management and Budget; U.S. Senator 2011–2023
Trey Radel – former Republican Congressman from Florida
James B. Ray – Governor of Indiana, 1825–1831
Lindsay Reynolds – chief of staff to First Lady of the United States Melania Trump  
Jerry Rubin – political activist, Chicago Seven
Charles W. Sawyer – United States Secretary of Commerce, 1948–1953 under President Harry Truman
Milton Sayler – Cincinnati city councilman, Congressman, 1873–1879
Bob Schaffer – former Republican Congressman from Colorado
Bob Schuler – Ohio State Senator, 2002–2009
P.G. Sittenfeld – former Cincinnati city councilman, convicted of felony bribery
Kathleen Sebelius – Governor of Kansas 2003–2009, United States Secretary of Health and Human Services 2009–14
William B. Shattuc – Congressman, 1897–1903
Bellamy Storer (1796–1875) – lawyer, Congressman, 1835–1837
Bellamy Storer (1847–1922) – Congressman, 1891–1895, diplomat
Bob Taft – Governor of Ohio, 1999–2007
Charles Phelps Taft II – Mayor of Cincinnati, 1955–1957
Robert A. Taft – Senate leader; son of William Howard Taft
William Howard Taft – 27th President of the United States, Chief Justice of the Supreme Court

Business

Marcellus Bailey – patent attorney for Alexander Graham Bell
Emma Beckwith – bookkeeper, optician, inventor, suffragette
Powel Crosley Jr. – inventor and entrepreneur
Francis L. Dale – lawyer, Cincinnati Reds owner, Republican Party operative
Maxwell Dane – advertising executive
James Gamble – co-founder of Procter & Gamble
Alfred T. Goshorn – businessman, civic booster, founder of the Cincinnati Red Stockings, the first professional baseball team
Kevin Harrington – infomercial entrepreneur 
Louise McCarren Herring – leader of the credit union movement
Charles R. Hook Sr. – steel industrialist
Ronald Howes – inventor of the Easy-Bake Oven
Jeffrey R. Immelt – CEO of General Electric
Charles Keating – banker involved in savings and loan crisis of the 1980s
Jim Koch – founder of Boston Beer Company
Bernard Kroger – founder of the Kroger supermarket chain
Isaac Herbert Kempner – founder of Imperial Sugar
James Michael Lafferty – CEO of Fine Hygienic Holding. Former Regional CEO for Procter & Gamble, Coca-Cola and British American Tobacco; Olympic Track and Field Coach
Harry Ward Leonard – electrical engineer and inventor
Carl Lindner, Jr. – businessman and co-founder of United Dairy Farmers; founder of American Financial Group
Michael Malatin – pioneer in hospital valet parking
William F. Nast – diplomat, railroad businessman
Henry Nicholas – communications technology entrepreneur
Stephen Sanger – former chairman of General Mills
Marge Schott – women's business pioneer; former owner of the Cincinnati Reds
David Sinton – pig iron industrialist
Ted Turner – founder of Turner Broadcasting System
David Uible – businessman and county commissioner
Douglas A. Warner III – banker
Joseph Ray Watkins – born in city, was an entrepreneur and founder of Watkins Incorporated
Luman Watson – 19th century clockmaker
Granville Woods – inventor

Science

Cleveland Abbe – meteorologist
C. David Allis – geneticist
Richard Allison – Surgeon General of the Army
Ellen Harding Baker – astronomer and teacher
Charles J. Bates – food scientist
Amanda Bauer – astronomer
George Robert Carruthers – physicist
Robin T. Cotton – pediatrician
Naomi Deutsch – nurse and educator
Michael Dine – theoretical physicist
William Doherty – entomologist
Joseph Leo Doob – mathematician
Ronald G. Douglas – mathematician and university provost
Daniel Drake – physician and writer
Richard S. Hamilton – mathematician
Olive Hazlett – mathematician
Henry Heimlich – co-developer of the Heimlich maneuver
Karl Gordon Henize – NASA astronaut
Robert Kistner – gynecologist, textbook author
Thomas Samuel Kuhn – science historian
John Mauchly – physicist, co-designer of ENIAC
Ann Moore – pediatric nurse, inventor of the Snugli baby carrier
Sharlotte Neely -anthropologist
Louis Harry Newburgh - Professor of Clinical Investigation
Joseph Ransohoff – neurosurgeon
Samuel Mitja Rapoport — biochemist, Communist activist in Cincinnati in the 1930s
Tom Rapoport – cell biologist at the Harvard Medical School
Marion Rawson – archaeologist
George Rieveschl – inventor of Benadryl
Rae Robertson-Anderson – biophysicist
Albert Sabin – discoverer of oral polio vaccine

Journalism and media

Jon Arthur – syndicated radio personality
Gamaliel Bailey – journalist and abolitionist
Delilah L. Beasley – first African American woman to be published regularly in a major metropolitan newspaper
Marty Brennaman – Cincinnati Reds radio play-by-play announcer 1974–2019
Thom Brennaman – sports broadcaster
Gary Burbank – radio personality
Nick Clooney – journalist, anchorman, and television host, father of George Clooney
Gail Collins – columnist for The New York Times
The Cool Ghoul, real name Dick VonHoene – news anchor, talk show and horror-movie show host
Bill Cunningham – attorney, radio and television talk show host
Paul Dixon – Cincinnati-area daytime television host
Elizabeth Drew – political journalist and author
Courtis Fuller – local news anchor
Bill Hemmer – Fox News Channel anchor and correspondent; former CNN anchor and reporter
Steven L. Herman – Voice of America bureau chief and correspondent
Derrin Horton – sportscaster
Joe Kernen – CNBC news anchor
Dan La Botz – journalist, author and socialist activist
Alan Light – former editor of 'VIBE and SpinRuth Lyons – radio and television personality
Edward Deering Mansfield – 19th-century newspaper editor
William Maxwell – engraver, printer, publisher of the first newspaper in Cincinnati
Mike McConnell – syndicated radio talk show host
John Roll McLean – owner and publisher of The Cincinnati Enquirer and The Washington PostWashington McLean – owner and publisher of The Cincinnati Enquirer and The Washington PostErin McPike – White House Correspondent for Independent Journal Review, formerly with CNN and NBC News
David Mendell – journalist and Barack Obama biographer
Dan Patrick – sportscaster and radio personality (from Mason, Ohio, a suburb of Cincinnati)
Virginia Payne – radio actress
Wally Phillips – radio personality
James S. Robbins – opinion journalist, author and scholar
Glenn Ryle – television personality
Al Schottelkotte – television news anchor and reporter
Bob Shreve – early television personality
Larry Smith – Puppeteer and children's television host
Tony Snow – news commentator, White House Press Secretary for George W. Bush administration
Dale Sommers – radio personality also known as "the Truckin' Bozo"
Estelle Sternberger – radio commentator and women's activist
Anne Marie Tiernon – local news anchor
Linda Vester – Fox News Channel anchor
Carolyn Washburn – former vice president and editor of the Cincinnati EnquirerLiz Wheeler – conservative political commentator, formerly with One America News Network
Todd Wright – Sports radio personality
Frederick Ziv – television producer and syndication pioneer

Artists and entertainment
Acting, motion pictures, and television

Kevin Allison – actor, sketch comedian (The State)
Patti Astor – Underground film actress
Theda Bara – silent film actress
Powhatan Beaty – American Civil War soldier and stage actor
Louise Beavers – actress
Andy Blankenbuehler – dancer and choreographer
Ron Bohmer – singer and actor
Zach Bolton – voice actor and ADR director affiliated with Funimation
Mark Boone Junior – actor
Lee Bowman – film and television actor
Bob Braun – local television and radio personality
Don Brodie – actor and director
Nana Bryant – actress
Mabel Brownell – stage actress
Rebecca Budig – soap opera and television actress
Marty Callner – music video director
Rocky Carroll – actor (NCIS)
Marguerite Clark – stage and silent film actress
Rosemary Clooney – singer and actress (White Christmas)
Majel Coleman – actress and model
Ray Combs – host of Family Feud, 1988–1994
Walter Connolly – film actor
Shamika Cotton – actress
Chase Crawford – actor and producer
Joel Crothers – actor
Raymond Garfield Dandridge – poet 
Doris Day – popular singer and actress
Tim de Zarn – actor
Gabrielle Dennis – actress (The Game)
John Diehl – actor
John Dierkes – actor
Pamella D'Pella – actress
Carmen Electra (born Tara Leigh Patrick) – actress, singer
Vera-Ellen – actress and dancer (White Christmas)
Susan Floyd – actress
Trixie Friganza – vaudeville and film actress
Stephen Geoffreys – film, stage, and gay pornography actor
Nikki Glaser – actress and stand-up comedian 
Sidney M. Goldin – silent film director
Charles Guggenheim – movie director
Julie Hagerty – model and actress (Airplane!)
Pauline Hall – stage actress and dancer
Porter Hall – actor (Miracle on 34th Street)
Emily Harper – actress
Tiffany Hines – actress 
Libby Holman – torch singer and actress
Tonya Ingram – poet, disability activist, mental health advocate
IShowSpeed, real name Darren Watkins Jr. – YouTube personality, streamer, rapper, and songwriter
Arthur V. Johnson – silent film actor and director
Lanny Joon – actor
Noah Keen – actor
Dagney Kerr – actress
Mike Kleinhenz – voice actor
Ida Koverman – Metro-Goldwyn-Mayer film executive
Eric Lange – actor (Lost and Victorious)
Dorothy Layton – actress
KiKi Layne – actress
Hal Le Roy – dancer, singer, stage actor
Hudson Leick – actress
Edward LeSaint – silent film actor and director
Marcia Lewis – actress
Vicki Lewis – actress (NewsRadio)
Floriana Lima – actress
Todd Louiso – actor
Gina Malo – actress
Irene Manning – actress and singer
Jack Manning – actor
Markiplier, real name Mark Edward Fischbach – YouTube personality, originally from Honolulu, later moved to Los Angeles
Ann May – silent film actress
Eve McVeagh – actress
Blanche Mehaffey – showgirl and actress
Gertrude Michael – film and television actress
Fanny Midgley – silent film actress
Harry F. Millarde – silent film actor and director
Marjorie Monaghan – actress
J. Madison Wright Morris – actress and model
Kathryn Morris – actress (Cold Case)
Sydney Morton – actor
Heidi Mueller – actress
Pamela Myers – Broadway and television actress
Stephen Nichols – actor
Luke Null – comedian, cast member on Saturday Night Live
Gary Owen – stand-up comedian and actor 
Jay Patterson – actor
Jo Ellen Pellman - actress
Richard M. Powell – television and film screenwriter
Tyrone Power – actor (The Mark of Zorro, Witness for the Prosecution)
Lee Roy Reams – Broadway actor and director, born in Covington, Kentucky
Theresa Rebeck – television (NYPD Blue) and film screenwriter
Theodore Reed – movie director
Hari Rhodes – actor
Sy Richardson – actor
Diana-Maria Riva – actress
Dennis Roady – actor and YouTube personality
Wendy Robie – actress
Roy Rogers – actor and singer, iconic western film star
Bonnie Rotten – porn star
Brenda Scott – actress
Tom Segura – comedian
Iva Shepard – silent film actress
Gertrude Short – silent film actress
Hal Sparks – actor and comedian
Shane Sparks – choreographer
Steven Spielberg – Oscar-winning film director
Jerry Springer – mayor of Cincinnati, talk show host (born in London, of Austrian parents)
Pat Stanley – actress, dancer, and singer
Galadriel Stineman – actress
Brette Taylor – actress and singer-songwriter
Amanda Tepe – actress
Jordan Trovillion – actress and singer
Evelyn Venable – actress
Daniel von Bargen – actor
Patricia Wettig – actress and playwright
Robert J. Wilke – actor
Katt Williams – stand-up comedian and actor
Jennie Worrell – 19th century burlesque actress
Rudy Wurlitzer – screenwriter
Amy Yasbeck – actress
Wolfgang Zilzer – actor

Music

Marty Balin – founder and original lead singer of Jefferson Airplane
Adrian Belew – guitarist and vocalist (Frank Zappa, King Crimson)
Matt Berninger – lead singer of The National
LaKiesha Berri – R&B singer
Boom Bip – electronic musician
Andy Biersack – rock singer (Black Veil Brides)
Bobby Borchers – country music singer-songwriter
Earl Bostic – jazz and rhythm and blues alto saxophonist
Mia Carruthers – singer-songwriter
Mel Carter – R&B singer
Bootsy Collins – Parliament Funkadelic funk bass player
Danny Cox – folk singer/songwriter
Gustav Dannreuther – violinist and conductor
Hal Davis – songwriter and record producer for Motown Records
Carl Dobkins, Jr. – rockabilly singer
George Duning – trumpet and piano player
Fat Jon – hip hop producer
Frank Foster – jazz saxophonist, composer and arranger
Stephen Foster – songwriter and arranger
Homer and Jethro – Grammy-winning country comedy duo
H-Bomb Ferguson – jump blues singer
Henry Fillmore – march music composer
Peter Frampton – musician, previously lived in Cincinnati
Jane French – singer-songwriter
Reed Ghazala – electronic musician and instrument builder
Larry Hall – singer ("Sandy")
Fred Hersch – jazz pianist
Hi-Tek – rapper and producer
Joel Hills Johnson - gospel songwriter called "Zion's Songster"
Gloria Jones – singer-songwriter 
Grandpa Jones – entertainer, banjo player and "old time" country and gospel singer
Steve Kipner – songwriter ("Let's Get Physical")
Drew Lachey – winner of Dancing With The StarsNick Lachey – lead singer of 98 Degrees
James Levine – conductor
Scott Lindroth – composer
Lonnie Mack – blues artist
Arlo McKinley – singer-songwriter
Len Mink – Christian evangelist and musician
Sonny Moorman – blues guitarist
Nicole C. Mullen – songwriter and choreographer
Naked Cowboy – busker
Ralph Penland – jazz drummer
Awadagin Pratt - concert pianist
Tyler Ramsey – guitarist for Band of Horses
Antonio "L.A." Reid – record executive
Katie Reider – singer-songwriter
Sheldon Reynolds – R&B guitarist
George Russell – jazz pianist and composer
Mamie Smith – blues singer
Sudan Archives — violinist and R&B singer 
Merle Travis – country and western singer, songwriter, and guitarist
Constance Cochnower Virtue - composer
Speed Walton – hip hop musician
Leon Wesley Walls – singer-songwriter
David Wolfenberger – singer-songwriter
Andy Williams – pop singer
Philippe Wynne – lead singer for The Spinners

Groups
98 Degrees – boy band of the 1990s
Afghan Whigs – rock band
Ass Ponys – rock band
The Bears – rock band
Beneath the Sky – metalcore band
Black Veil Brides – rock band
Blessid Union of Souls – rock band
Buffalo Killers – rock band
The Casinos – doo-wop group
The Deele – R&B/Soul group
Bo Donaldson and The Heywoods – 1970s pop band
Ellery – alt-folk band
Five Deez – Hip Hop group
Foxy Shazam – rock band
The Greenhornes – rock band
Heartless Bastards – indie rock band
The Isley Brothers – R&B/soul group
The Lemon Pipers – pop band from the 1960s
The National – indie rock band
Otis Williams and the Charms – doo-wop vocal group
Over the Rhine – rock band
RyanDan – dual operatic singer/gospel
Pure Prairie League – pop/country band
Pomegranates – indie rock band
The Students – doo-wop group
Walk the Moon – indie-rock band
Wussy – indie rock band

Authors

Karen Ackerman – children's author
Melissa Elizabeth Riddle Banta (1834–1907) – poet
Thomas Berger – author
Christopher Bollen – novelist
Fredric Brown – author
Alice Cary – poet
Phoebe Cary – poet
Stuart Archer Cohen – novelist
Sharon Creech – novelist
Michael Cunningham – novelist (The Hours)
Nikki Giovanni – poet and author
Shari Goldhagen – novelist
Richard Hague – poet, author and educator
Kenneth Koch – New York School poet
Tim Lucas – film critic, novelist, author
William Matthews – poet
William Holmes McGuffey – educator, author of McGuffey Readers
Karen Marie Moning – paranormal romance/thriller author
David Quammen – science and travel writer
Susan Elizabeth Phillips – author
Mike Resnick – Hugo Award-winning science fiction writer
Helen Hooven Santmyer – writer
Stanley Schmidt – science fiction author and magazine editor
Curtis Sittenfeld – novelist
Henry Thew Stevenson – academic and writer
Harriet Beecher Stowe – author and abolitionist
Edmund White – author
Jonathan Valin – novelist

Visual artists

James Presley Ball – photographer and abolitionist
Karl Bissinger – photographer
Robert Frederick Blum – lithographer
Jim Borgman – Pulitzer Prize-winning editorial cartoonist
Jim Dine – pop artist
Robert S. Duncanson – painter and muralist
Frank Duveneck – figure and portrait painter
Elliot Earls – graphic designer
Alfred Oscar Elzner – architect
Suzanne Farrell – ballerina
Tim Folzenlogen – realist painter
William H. Fry – Aesthetic movement wood carver and gilder
Frank J. Girardin – painter
Daniel Greene – painter
Harry Hake – architect
Samuel Hannaford – architect, designer of Cincinnati's Music Hall
Charley Harper – wildlife artist
Robert Henri – painter, leader of the Ashcan School movement
Ida Holterhoff Holloway – painter 
Charles S. Kaelin – American Impressionist painter
Graham Ingels – comic book and magazine illustrator
Thomas Rogers Kimball – architect
Janis Crystal Lipzin – multi-media artist, filmmaker, photographer
Gary Lord (artist) – faux painter and decorator
Winsor McCay – comic strip artist, animator
Mary Louise McLaughlin – ceramic painter and studio potter
Lewis Henry Meakin – American Impressionist painter
Henry Mosler – painter
Alfred B. Mullett – architect
Frank Harmon Myers – painter
Charles Henry Niehaus – sculptor
Thomas Satterwhite Noble – painter
Elizabeth Nourse – painter
Diane Pfister – artist and painter
Edward Henry Potthast – American Impressionist painter
Hiram Powers – sculptor
John Ruthven – painter of wildlife
Kataro Shirayamadani – ceramic painter
Sheida Soleimani – Iranian-American multidisciplinary artist
Lilly Martin Spencer – painter
Francis Marion Stokes – architect
Maria Longworth Nichols Storer – founder of the Rookwood Pottery Company
Adolph Strauch – landscape architect
John Robinson Tait – landscape painter
Tony Tasset – contemporary artist
Tom Tsuchiya – sculptor
John Henry Twachtman – impressionist landscape painter
Leon Van Loo – photographer
Edward Charles Volkert – American Impressionist painter
Tom Wesselmann – pop artist

Sports
Baseball

Mike Adams – MLB outfielder
Ethan Allen – MLB player, coach at Yale University
Nick Altrock – MLB pitcher
Charlie Armbruster – MLB catcher
Skeeter Barnes – MLB utility player
Al Bashang – MLB outfielder
Buddy Bell - MLB third baseman and manager
Charlie Bell – MLB pitcher
David Bell – MLB third baseman and Cincinnati Reds manager
Frank Bell – MLB player
Mike Bell – MLB third baseman
Andrew Benintendi – MLB outfielder
Ralph Birkofer – MLB pitcher
Red Bittmann – MLB second baseman
Ethan Blackaby – MLB outfielder
Jim Bolger – MLB outfielder
Barry Bonnell – MLB player
Daryl Boston – MLB outfielder
Buzz Boyle – MLB outfielder
Jack Boyle – MLB player
Jimmy Boyle – MLB catcher
Andrew Brackman – former MLB pitcher
Ed Brinkman – MLB player
Jim Brosnan – MLB pitcher, author of The Long Season and Pennant Race''
Nelson Burbrink – MLB catcher and scout
Moe Burtschy – MLB pitcher
Jack Bushelman – MLB pitcher
Flea Clifton – MLB pitcher
Joe Crotty – MLB catcher
Bob Daughters – MLB player
Zach Day – MLB pitcher
Dory Dean – MLB pitcher
Drew Denson – MLB first baseman
Red Dooin – MLB player and manager
Bill Doran – MLB second baseman
Richard Dotson – MLB pitcher
Dick Drott – MLB pitcher
Louis Dula – Negro leagues pitcher
Leon Durham – MLB player
Joe Ellick – MLB player
Buck Ewing – Hall of Fame catcher and manager
Bill Faul – MLB pitcher
Tom Flanigan – MLB pitcher
Danny Friend – MLB pitcher
Charlie Grant – Negro leagues second baseman
Bob Gilks – MLB player
Ed Glenn – MLB player
Charlie Gould – National League baseball player
Ken Griffey Jr. – MLB outfielder, Baseball Hall of Famer (born in Donora, Pennsylvania, but grew up in Cincinnati)
Tommy Griffith – MLB outfielder
Heinie Groh – MLB third baseman
Josh Harrison – MLB third baseman
Dan Hayden – Miami University (OH) baseball coach
August Herrmann – Cincinnati Reds president, 1903–1920
Johnny Hodapp – MLB infielder
Ed Hug – MLB catcher
Miller Huggins – MLB player; Hall of Fame manager for the New York Yankees
Roy Hughes – MLB infielder
Tom Hume – MLB pitcher and coach
Adam Hyzdu – MLB and Japanese baseball outfielder
Larry Jacobus – MLB pitcher
Betsy Jochum – All-American Girls Professional Baseball League player
Lance Johnson – MLB player
David Justice – MLB player
Al Kaiser – MLB outfielder
Dorothy Kamenshek – All-American Girls Professional Baseball League player
Scott Klingenbeck – MLB pitcher
Eddie Kolb – MLB pitcher, businessman
Al Lakeman – MLB player
Margie Lang – All-American Girls Professional Baseball League player
Barry Larkin – MLB shortstop, Baseball Hall of Famer
Stephen Larkin – MLB first baseman
Steve Larkin – MLB pitcher
Charlie Leesman – MLB pitcher
Dick LeMay – MLB pitcher 
Jensen Lewis – MLB pitcher
Jim Leyritz – MLB catcher
Bill Long – MLB pitcher
Garry Maddox – MLB outfielder
Lee Magee – MLB player and manager
Art Mahaffey – MLB pitcher
Lefty Marr – MLB third baseman
Len Matuszek – MLB first baseman
Wally Mayer – MLB catcher
Roger McDowell – MLB pitcher and coach
Bobby Mitchell – MLB pitcher
Ralph Miller – MLB pitcher
Ron Moeller – MLB pitcher
Bobby Moore – MLB player who is currently a coach for the Atlanta Braves organization
Red Munson – MLB catcher
Charles Murphy – sportswriter, owner of the Chicago Cubs
Tim Naehring – MLB player
Russ Nagelson – MLB player
Chris Nichting – MLB pitcher
Bob Nieman – MLB player
Russ Nixon – MLB player and manager (born in Cleves, a suburb of Cincinnati)
Joe Nuxhall – pitcher, later long-time color commentator for Cincinnati Reds games (from Hamilton, Ohio)
Brian O'Connor MLB pitcher
Ron Oester – MLB player
Jayhawk Owens – MLB player
Dave Parker – MLB player, born in Mississippi, grew up in Cincinnati
George Paynter – MLB outfielder
George Pechiney – MLB pitcher
Dave Pember – MLB pitcher
Shannon Penn – MLB designated hitter
Eduardo Pérez – MLB player; son of Tony Pérez
Jack Pfiester – MLB pitcher
Cy Pfirman – MLB umpire
Icicle Reeder – MLB outfielder
Tuffy Rhodes – MLB and Japanese player
Billy Riley – MLB player outfielder
Pete Rose – All-Star MLB player, holds record for most hits in a career
Pete Rose Jr. – minor league baseball player
Jeff Russell – MLB pitcher
Scott Sauerbeck – MLB pitcher
Admiral Schlei – MLB catcher
Jimmy Shevlin – MLB first baseman
John Shoupe – 19th-century shortstop
Joe Smith – MLB player
Rudy Sommers – MLB pitcher
Ed Sperber – MLB outfielder
Jake Stenzel – MLB outfielder
Shannon Stewart – MLB player
Eric Surkamp – MLB pitcher
Brent Suter – MLB pitcher
Pat Tabler – MLB player and baseball analyst
Kent Tekulve – MLB pitcher
Bill Wegman – MLB pitcher
Marie Wegman – All-American Girls Professional Baseball League player
Alex Wimmers – MLB pitcher
George Yeager – MLB catcher
Kevin Youkilis – All Star MLB first and third baseman
Don Zimmer – MLB player and manager

Basketball
Luke Babbitt – NBA player
Dennis Bell – NBA player
Tom Boerwinkle – NBA player
Ric Bucher – ESPN NBA analyst
Rick Calloway – NBA player
Jeremy Chappell – Robert Morris and European league player
 Kwan Cheatham (born 1995) - basketball player in the Israel Basketball Premier League
Semaj Christon – Xavier University and NBA Development League player
Mick Cronin – UCLA and University of Cincinnati basketball coach
Ralph Crosthwaite – Western Kentucky University and NBA player
Erik Daniels – University of Kentucky and NBA player
Dee Davis – WNBA player
Derrek Dickey – NBA player and analyst
Justin Doellman – Xavier University and Spanish League player 
Josh Duncan – Xavier University and European league player
 Jacob Eisner – Israeli basketball player
Robin Freeman – 1955 and 1956 All-American at Ohio State
Yancy Gates – player for Ironi Nahariya of the Israeli Premier League
Matt Harpring – NBA player
Tyrone Hill – Xavier University and NBA player
Robert Hite – NBA player
Rick Hughes – NBA player
Brandon Hunter – NBA player
Kannard Johnson – NBA player
Pat Kelsey – College of Charleston Cougars men's basketball head coach
Shane Larkin – NBA player, son of Barry Larkin
Brad Loesing – Wofford and European league player
Mike Mathis – NBA referee
Kelsey Mitchell – 2018 Big Ten Women's Basketball Player of the Year for Ohio State
Louis Orr – NBA player and college coach
Dave Robisch – NBA and ABA player
Kelly Schumacher – WNBA basketball player
Jordan Sibert – NBA player
Mel Thomas – UConn player
LaSalle Thompson – NBA player
Bob Wiesenhahn – NBA player
Devin Williams – West Virginia and NBA G League player

Boxing
Tim Austin – 1992 Olympic bronze medalist and bantamweight boxing champion
Adrien Broner – light welterweight boxer
Ezzard Charles – heavyweight champion boxer
Larry Donald – Olympic and professional heavyweight boxer
George Foster – featherweight boxer
Billy Joiner – heavyweight boxer and trainer
Freddie Miller – featherweight boxer
Aaron Pryor – world light welterweight champion boxer
Brad Rone – journeyman boxer who died in the ring
Ronald Siler – 2004 Olympic flyweight boxer
Wallace Smith – lightweight boxer
Reggie Strickland – has the most known losses of any boxer in history
Tony Tubbs – heavyweight boxer
Rau'shee Warren – bantamweight boxer
Ricardo Williams – 2000 Olympic light welterweight silver medalist boxer
Harry Woodson – 19th century boxer

Football

Alex Albright – NFL linebacker
Don Allard – NFL quarterback
Kevin Allen – NFL offensive tackle
Darren Anderson – NFL cornerback
Mel Anthony – Michigan and CFL fullback; 1965 Rose Bowl MVP
Steve Apke – replacement player during 1987 NFL players' strike
B.J. Askew – NFL fullback
Alex Bannister – NFL wide receiver
Darren Barnett – NFL cornerback
Ron Beagle – College Football Hall of Fame end for Navy 
Bruce Beekley – NFL linebacker
Ed Biles – NFL Houston Oilers head coach, 1981–1983
Rocky Boiman – Notre Dame and NFL linebacker, radio host
Vaughn Booker – NFL defensive end
Jim Boyle – NFL offensive tackle
Colin Branch – NFL safety
Tyrone Brown – NFL and CFL wide receiver
Al Brosky – College Football Hall of Fame cornerback
Dante Brown – NFL running back
Ricky Brown – NFL linebacker for Boston College and the Oakland Raiders
Trevor Canfield – NFL offensive lineman 
Tank Carradine – Florida State and NFL defensive tackle
Brent Celek – NFL tight end
Garrett Celek – NFL tight end
Frank Clair – Canadian Football League coach
Vinnie Clark – NFL cornerback
Robert Cobb – NFL defensive end
John Conner – University of Kentucky and New York Jets fullback
Bob Crable – NFL player, businessman
Shane Curry – NFL defensive end; murdered in 1992
Dane Dastillung – American football player
Jerome Davis – NFL nose tackle
Wayne Davis – NFL cornerback
Jerry Doerger – NFL center
Nate Ebner – Ohio State and NFL New England Patriots safety and 2016 rugby sevens Olympian
Dixon Edwards – NFL linebacker
Marc Edwards – NFL fullback
Ray Edwards – NFL defensive end
Mark Elder – Eastern Kentucky college football head coach
Mark Fischer – Purdue and Washington Redskins offensive lineman
Dave Foley – Ohio State and NFL offensive tackle
Greg Frey – Ohio State quarterback
Bob Fry – NFL offensive lineman
Dave Frye – NFL linebacker
Bob Goodridge – NFL wide receiver
Dick Gordon – Pro Bowl wide receiver
Carlton Gray – NFL cornerback
Gino Guidugli – University of Cincinnati quarterback
Darryl Hardy – NFL linebacker
Maurice Harvey – NFL safety
Clint Haslerig – Michigan and NFL wide receiver
Don Hasselbeck – NFL tight end
Joel Heath – NFL defensive tackle
Rodney Heath – NFL cornerback
Mark Herrmann – NFL quarterback
Jordan Hicks – NFL linebacker
Alex Higdon – Ohio State and NFL tight end
Darius Hillary – Wisconsin and NFL cornerback
Robert Hoernschemeyer – NFL running back
Jack Hoffman – NFL player
 Sam Hubbard – defensive end for the Ohio State Buckeyes and the Cincinnati Bengals
Kevin Huber – NFL punter
Russ Huesman – college football coach
Tony Hunter – Notre Dame and NFL tight end
Tom Jackson – NFL player and ESPN analyst (lives in Cincinnati)
Dan James – NFL and Ohio State offensive lineman
Melvin Johnson – NFL safety 
Paris Johnson Jr. – Ohio State offensive lineman
Greg Jones – NFL linebacker
Michael Jordan – NFL offensive lineman 
Steve Junker – NFL tight end
Mark Kamphaus – Boston College quarterback
Eric Kattus – NFL tight end
Terry Killens – NFL linebacker
Austin King – NFL center
Eric Joel Kresser – NFL quarterback
Luke Kuechly – NFL linebacker; 2013 NFL Defensive Player of the Year
David Long Jr. – NFL linebacker
Dante Love – Ball State wide receiver
Greg Mancz – NFL center
Michael Matthews – NFL tight end
Napoleon McCallum – College Football Hall of Fame running back for Navy
Jake McQuaide – Los Angeles Rams Pro Bowl Long snapper
Brandon Miree – NFL fullback
Michael Muñoz – Tennessee offensive tackle
Justin Murray – NFL offensive tackle
Leon Murray – Tennessee State quarterback
Rico Murray – NFL cornerback
Al Nelson – former NFL cornerback
Steve Niehaus – first draft choice of NFL Seattle Seahawks; defensive tackle
Ray Nolting – NFL running back, University of Cincinnati football coach
Andrew Norwell – NFL offensive lineman, 2017 All-Pro
David Nugent – NFL defensive lineman
Tom O'Brien – North Carolina State Wolfpack football head coach
Antwan Peek – NFL linebacker
Ahmed Plummer – NFL cornerback (from Wyoming, suburb of Cincinnati)
P. J. Pope – NFL running back
DeVier Posey – NFL wide receiver 
George Ratterman – football player
Reggie Redding – NFL offensive lineman
Ike Reese – NFL linebacker and radio host
Jack Reynolds – NFL linebacker
J. Burton Rix – SMU and Miami (FL) head football coach
Kurt Rocco – Arena Football League quarterback
Kyle Rudolph – Minnesota Vikings tight end
Marcus Rush – NFL linebacker
Abdul Salaam – NFL defensive tackle
Greg Scruggs – NFL linebacker
Mike Sensibaugh – NFL safety
Tyler Sheehan – NFL and indoor football quarterback
Ed Shuttlesworth – Michigan and CFL fullback
Chris Smith – NFL running back
Sean Smith – NFL defensive end
Kirk Springs – NFL safety
Ryan Stanchek – NFL offensive lineman
Ralph Staub – Cincinnati Bearcats football player and coach
Roger Staubach – Heisman Trophy-winning Pro Football Hall of Fame quarterback
Milt Stegall – NFL and CFL wide receiver, Canadian Football Hall of Famer
Greg Stemrick – NFL cornerback
Ken Stone – NFL safety
Zach Strief – NFL offensive lineman
Dana Stubblefield – NFL defensive tackle
Steve Sylvester – NFL offensive lineman
Matthew Teague – NFL and CFL linebacker
Matt Tennant – NFL offensive lineman
Steve Tensi – NFL quarterback
Brian Townsend – NFL linebacker
DeJuan Tribble – NFL cornerback
Tom Waddle – NFL wide receiver and football analyst
Eric Wood – NFL center
Spencer Ware – NFL running back
Adolphus Washington – Ohio State and NFL defensive tackle
John Wiethe – All-Pro NFL guard/linebacker and Cincinnati Bearcats men's basketball head coach, 1946–1952
Russell Wilson – NFL quarterback and Super Bowl XLVIII Champion
DeShawn Wynn – NFL running back

Golf
Jim Herman (1977-) - professional golfer
Bob Lohr (1960-) – professional golfer
Tom Nieporte (1928-2014) – professional golfer
Brett Wetterich (1973-) – professional golfer

Tennis
Winona Closterman (1877-1944) – tennis player
Ruth Sanders Cordes (1890-1968) – tennis player
Steve DeVries (1964-) – tennis player
Nat Emerson (1874-1958) – tennis player
Nicole Gibbs (1993-) – tennis player
Reuben A. Holden III (1890-1967) – tennis player
Emmy Kaiser (1990-) – Wheelchair tennis player
Louis Kuhler (1902-1925) – tennis player
Paul Kunkel (1903-1977) – amateur tennis player
Barry MacKay (1935-2012) – tennis player and broadcaster
Caty McNally (2001-) – tennis player
Monica Nolan (1913-1995) – tennis player
Eric Quigley (1989-) – tennis player
Dudley Sutphin (1875-1926) – tennis player, lawyer
Bill Talbert (1918-1999) – tennis player and administrator
Tony Trabert (1930-2021) – tennis player and instructor
Clara Louise Zinke (1909-1978) – tennis player

Other

Rachael Adams – 2016 Olympic women's volleyball bronze medalist
Eddie Arcaro – Triple Crown-winning jockey
Amanda Borden – 1996 gold-medal winning gymnast
Danielle Borgman – professional soccer player
Jordan Brauninger – figure skater
Aimee Bruder – bronze medal-winning Paralympics swimmer
Caleb Bragg – racecar driver and automobile inventor
Marc Burch – Major League Soccer defender
Amber Campbell – 2008 and 2012 Olympic Games hammer thrower
Steve Cauthen – Triple Crown-winning jockey (from Covington, Kentucky)
Rodney Combs – NASCAR driver
Katherine Copely – Lithuanian ice dancer
G. C. Cox – racecar driver
Angelo Dawkins – WWE tag team wrestler with Street Profits
Deena Deardurff – 1972 Olympic swimming gold medalist
Rich Franklin – Ultimate Fighting Championship champion
Curt Fraser – National Hockey League (NHL) player and coach
Christina Gao – figure skater
Mike Goldberg – Ultimate Fighting Championship play-by-play commentator
Jonathan Good – AEW professional wrestler known as Jon Moxley; formerly known as Dean Ambrose in WWE
Nick Hagglund – FC Cincinnati soccer player
Harlan Holden – track and field athlete at the 1912 Summer Olympics
Ted Horn – race car driver
DeHart Hubbard – first African-American to win an individual Olympic gold medal
Joseph Hudepohl – Olympic swimmer
Tori Huster – soccer player
Julie Isphording – long-distance runner
Rebecca Jasontek – 2004 bronze medal-winning synchronized swimmer
Jenny Kemp – 1972 Olympic swimming gold medalist
Dan Ketchum – Olympic swimmer
Aubrey Kingsbury – professional soccer player of Washington Spirit
Walter Laufer – 1928 gold medal-winning swimmer
Rose Lavelle – 2019 FIFA Women's World Cup champion and NWSL player for OL Reign
Linda Miles – professional wrestler (WWE's "Shaniqua")
Betsy Mitchell – 1984 Olympic swimming gold medalist
Heather Mitts – soccer player
Darrell Pace – 1976 and 1984 Olympic gold-medal winning archer
David Payne – hurdler
Erin Phenix – gold-medal winning swimmer at the 2000 Summer Olympics
Brian Pillman – NFL nose tackle and professional wrestler
Brian Pillman Jr. – professional wrestler, son of Brian Pillman
Lexie Priessman – gymnast
Kerry Schall – UFC fighter
Vivian St. John – professional wrestler
Josh Schneider – former World Record holder, swimming
Robert Shmalo – ice dancer
Bridget Sloan – Olympic gymnast and 2009 world all-around champion
Sam Stoller – sprinter and long jumper
Les Thatcher – professional wrestler, announcer, and trainer
Nick Thoman – 2012 swimming gold medalist
Mary Lee Tracy – gymnastics coach
Albertson Van Zo Post – 1904 double gold medal-winning fencer
Bryan Volpenhein – 2004 gold medal-winning rower
Olga Strashun Weil – amateur golfer and tennis player
Mary Wineberg – 2008 Olympic gold medalist, track and field
Russ Witherby – Olympic ice dancing competitor
Brian Woermann – professional wrestler ("Matt Stryker")
Jimmy Yang – professional wrestler
Jeanne Zelasko – sports broadcaster

Military

Christian Albert – Medal of Honor recipient at Siege of Vicksburg
Nicholas Longworth Anderson – American Civil War Colonel
Edward William Boers – Navy Medal of Honor recipient
Henry Francis Bryan – United States Navy Rear Admiral and 17th governor of American Samoa
James Calhoun – cavalryman killed at Battle of the Little Bighorn
Henry M. Cist – American Civil War general
Charles Clark – Confederate Army general, plantation owner, Confederate Governor of Mississippi
Cordelia E Cook – first woman to receive both the Bronze Star Medal and Purple Heart
John Cook – Medal of Honor recipient at Battle of Antietam
Hubert Dilger – Civil War artillery officer
William Dwight – Union Civil War general
Wilson V. Eagleson II – U.S. Army Air Force officer and decorated combat fighter pilot with the prodigious Tuskegee Airmen
James E. Earheart, Jr. – Marine killed in action during World War II
William S. Fellers – Marine Corps Major general, Director of Staff of Inter-American Defense Board
Manning Force – American Civil War general and Medal of Honor recipient
John R. Fox – World War II-era Medal of Honor recipient
Kenner Garrard – American Civil War general
James Agustin Greer – Civil War-era Admiral
Webb Hayes – Medal of Honor recipient, co-founder of Union Carbide
Victor Heintz – decorated World War I veteran; Republican Congressman, 1917–1919
Andrew Hickenlooper – American Civil War general
Heinrich Hoffman – American Civil War Medal of Honor recipient
Francis Lupo – World War I soldier whose remains were discovered in 2003
William Haines Lytle – poet; Civil War general; killed at Battle of Chickamauga (1863)
Keith Matthew Maupin – soldier, missing and captured in Iraq for nearly four years
Nathaniel McLean – Union Civil War general
John Moore – Surgeon General of the Army
Abram S. Piatt – Union Civil War general
James Pine – United States Coast Guard Vice Admiral
John P. Slough – Union Civil War general
Melancthon S. Wade – Union Civil War general
Godfrey Weitzel – Union Civil War general

Other notable people

Clara Adams – aviation pioneer
Joseph H. Albers – first bishop of Lansing, Michigan
Anthony Allaire – New York City Police inspector
Michael Anthony – chef
Levi Addison Ault – businessman, naturalist, donor of Cincinnati's Ault Park
Samri Baldwin – stage magician
Daniel Carter Beard – founder Sons of Daniel Boone
Betty Blake – historic preservationist
Kim Bobo – labor activist
Thomas D. Boyatt – former United States Ambassador to Burkina Faso and Colombia
Kitty Burke – nightclub entertainer who attempted to bat in a baseball game
Mary Towne Burt – temperance reformer, newspaper publisher, and benefactor 
Oba Chandler – rapist and murderer on death row in Florida
Peter H. Clark – abolitionist and educator
Levi Coffin – abolitionist
Lorenzo Collins – mentally ill man shot by Cincinnati police in 1997
Robert Daniel Conlon – Roman Catholic Bishop of Steubenville, Ohio
Sara Jane Crafts (1845–1930), educator, author, social reformer
Moses Dickson – African-American abolitionist, soldier and minister
Jonathan Edwards – first president of Washington & Jefferson College
William Henry Elder – long-serving Roman Catholic Bishop of Cincinnati
Audrey Emery – heiress and socialite
Mary Emery – philanthropist
T. Higbee Embry – aviation enthusiast and co-founder of Embry-Riddle Aeronautical University
Dana Fabe – Chief Justice Alaska Supreme Court
Bernard T. Espelage – first Bishop of Gallup, New Mexico
Mary Jane Farell – Contract bridge player
Susan Fessenden (1840–1932) – activist, social reformer
Thomas Milton Gatch – president of Willamette University, Oregon State University and University of Washington
Nelson Glueck – rabbi and archaeologist
Alfred Gottschalk – President of Hebrew Union College and leader in Reform Judaism.
Henry Joseph Grimmelsmann – first Bishop of Evansville
Alice Claypoole Gwynne – wife of Cornelius Vanderbilt II
Don Helbig – Guinness World Record holder for roller coaster riding
John R. Hicks – murderer executed by the State of Ohio
Charles L. Kuhn – art historian
Alice Stone Ilchman – eighth president of Sarah Lawrence College
Joseph Jonas – first Jew to settle in Cincinnati, founder of the Old Jewish Cemetery
Stewart Judah – card magician
Posteal Laskey – serial killer nicknamed the "Cincinnati Strangler"
William Mackey Lomasney – Irish revolutionary
Longworth family – early leading Cincinnati family
Lytle family – early leading Cincinnati family
Mike Mangold – pilot
Helen Taft Manning – daughter of William Howard Taft, historian
Charles Manson – cult leader, convicted murderer
Carl K. Moeddel – auxiliary bishop of Roman Catholic Archdiocese of Cincinnati, 1993–2007
Julian Morgenstern – rabbi, professor, and president of Hebrew Union College
Sara Murphy – socialite, Pablo Picasso portrait subject
Anthony John King Mussio – first Roman Catholic bishop of Steubenville, Ohio
David Leroy Nickens – freed slave, first African American licensed minister in Ohio
Jack Norris – dietitian and vegan activist
Olive Peterson – Contract bridge player and teacher
David Philipson – Reform rabbi
John Baptist Purcell – long-serving Roman Catholic Bishop of Cincinnati
George Remus – bootlegger
Robert Ruwe – United States Tax Court judge
William Knox Schroeder – student killed in the Kent State shootings
William Smith – murderer executed in 2005
Hermann, Freiherr von Soden – biblical scholar
Joseph Strauss – chief engineer of the Golden Gate Bridge
Jule Sugarman – creator of Head Start
Denise Trauth – 9th President of Texas State University 
Myra L. Uhlfelder – classicist
Otto Warmbier – University of Virginia student arrested in North Korea; later died in custody in 2017
Irvin F. Westheimer – founder of Big Brothers Big Sisters of America

References

Cincinnati
Cincinnati
People